Niagara International Transportation Technology Coalition (NITTEC) is a road management system used in the Niagara Falls-Buffalo area and involves the co-operation from both Canada and the United States.

Members include:

 Buffalo and Fort Erie Public Bridge Authority
 City of Buffalo
 City of Niagara Falls, New York
 City of Niagara Falls, Ontario
 Erie County
 Ministry of Transportation (Ontario)
 New York State Department of Transportation
 New York State Thruway Authority
 Niagara County
 Niagara Falls Bridge Commission
 Niagara Frontier Transportation Authority
 Niagara Parks Commission
 Niagara Region
 Town of Fort Erie

Cameras

There are 59 cameras on the US Side and 9 on the Canadian side.

Roads with cameras include:

  I-190
  Kensington Expressway
  Scajaquada Expressway
  QEW
  Highway 405
 Rainbow Bridge
 Peace Bridge
 Queenston-Lewiston Bridge

Roads with signs are on the US side only:

  I-90
  I-190
  I-290

References
 NITTEC

External links
See NYS Thruway cameras
See NYS DOT cameras

Transportation in New York (state)
Transport in the Regional Municipality of Niagara